The 1989–90 European Cup was the 35th edition of Europe's premier club football tournament, the European Cup. The final was played at the Praterstadion in Vienna on 23 May 1990. The final was contested by Italian defending champions Milan and Portuguese two-time former winners Benfica. Milan successfully defended their title with a 1–0 victory, securing their fourth European Cup trophy. Milan remained the last team to successfully defend their trophy until Real Madrid did it again in 2017. Arsenal were denied a place in the competition, as this was the last year of a ban from European competitions for English clubs following the Heysel Stadium disaster of 1985.

Bracket

First round

|}

First leg

Due to fan incidents at the match, Sparta Prague were punished with a stadium ban, being ordered to play their next European home match at least  from Prague.

Second leg

Malmö FF won 2–1 on aggregate.

Mechelen won 5–0 on aggregate.

Milan won 5–0 on aggregate.

Real Madrid won 9–0 on aggregate.

Bayern Münich won 3–1 on aggregate.

17 Nëntori won 5–1 on aggregate.

Steaua București won 5–0 on aggregate.

PSV Eindhoven won 5–0 on aggregate.

Sparta Prague won 5–2 on aggregate.

CSKA Sofia won 6–2 on aggregate.

Marseille won 4–1 on aggregate.

AEK Athens won 5–4 on aggregate.

2–2 on aggregate; Budapesti Honvéd won on away goals.

Benfica won 6–1 on aggregate.

Dnipro Dnipropetrovsk won 3–1 on aggregate.

Swarovski Tirol won 9–2 on aggregate.

Second round

|}

First leg

Second leg

Mechelen won 4–1 on aggregate.

Milan won 2–1 on aggregate.

Bayern Münich won 6–1 on aggregate.

PSV Eindhoven won 5–2 on aggregate.

CSKA Sofia won 5–2 on aggregate.

Marseille won 3–1 on aggregate.

Benfica won 9–0 on aggregate.

Dnipro Dnipropetrovsk won 4–2 on aggregate.

Quarter-finals

|}

First leg

Second leg

Milan won 2–0 on aggregate.

Bayern Münich won 3–1 on aggregate.

Marseille won 4–1 on aggregate.

Benfica won 4–0 on aggregate.

Semi-finals

|}

First leg

Second leg

2–2 on aggregate; Milan won on away goals.

2–2 on aggregate; Benfica won on away goals.

Final

Top scorers

Notes

References

External links
1989–90 All matches – season at UEFA website
European Cup results at Rec.Sport.Soccer Statistics Foundation
 All scorers 1989–90 European Cup according to protocols UEFA
The European Champions' Cup 1989/90 – FC Bayern München (FRG)
1989/90 European Cup – results and line-ups (archive)

1989–90 in European football
European Champion Clubs' Cup seasons